Mai Kolachi (Lady Kolachi) was a fisher woman who settled near the delta of the Indus River to start a community. She lost her husband in a storm and despite the villagers warnings, went to search for him herself. Kolachi was successful and the village was named after her as Kolachi and this community was later developed into modern Karachi, Sindh, Pakistan.

Kolachi Tribe 
Kolachi or Kulachi is a Baloch tribe which originated from Kulanch, an area in Makran Balochistan. Mai Kolachi migrated from Makran and settled in the area presently known as Karachi. The word "Mai" is still used in Sindh and it means "Respected Lady".

Abdullah Goth 
"Kolachi" was reputedly founded by Baloch tribes from Balochistan and Makran, who established a small fishing community in the area. Descendants of the original community still live in the area on the small island of Abdullah Goth, which is located near the Karachi Port.

See also  
 Kulanch
 Kulachi (tribe)
 Kolachi (port)
 Krokola
 Karachi
Debal
 Banbhore

References

History of Sindh
History of Karachi
Baloch people
Sindhi people
Pakistani fishers
People from Karachi